...And a Happy New Year is a Christmas EP by the band The Maine. On December 4, 2008, the EP was announce for release. The EP was free for those that pre-ordered the deluxe edition of the band's debut album, Can't Stop Won't Stop. In addition, "Santa Stole My Girlfriend" was made available for streaming on the group's PureVolume account, while "Ho Ho Hopefully" was made available for streaming through the band's Myspace profile. The EP was made available for streaming on December 7 and was released on December 9 by Fearless Records.

Track listing

Personnel
 Members
 John O'Callaghan - lead vocals, piano
 Jared Monaco - lead guitar
 Kennedy Brock - rhythm guitar, vocals
 Garrett Nickelsen - bass guitar
 Pat Kirch - drums, percussion

Charts

References

External links

...And a Happy New Year at YouTube (streamed copy where licensed)

2008 EPs
The Maine (band) EPs
Fearless Records EPs
Christmas EPs
2008 Christmas albums
Christmas albums by American artists